C5a peptidase (streptococcal C5a peptidase, ScpA, ScpB, SCPA) is an enzyme. The primary cleavage site is at His67-Lys68 in human C5a with a minor secondary cleavage site at Ala58-Ser59.

This enzyme is a surface-associated subtilisin-like serine peptidase with very specific substrate preference.

References

External links 
 

EC 3.4.21